Dinesh Weerawansa (born 17 June 1966) has once again returned as editor-in-chief of the Sunday Observer from December 2019 for his second term. He held the same position for nine years from 2006 to 2015, heading the editorial operation of Sri Lanka's oldest English newspaper which has the largest circulation - published by the Associated Newspapers of Ceylon Limited. He had also functioned as chief editor of Daily News (2018) and also associate editor and sports editor of the Daily News and a visiting lecturer at National Olympic Academy of Sri Lanka.

Early life
Weerawansa was born to the late W. Cosmas Damian (Teachers' Training College Lecturer) and late Mercy Edna (English Trained teacher) on 17 June 1966 at Negombo, Sri Lanka. A Navodaya scholar, he was educated at the Royal College, Colombo - Senior College Prefect 1984/85 and Hostel Prefects' Advisor 1984/86. He then pursued further studies at the Thomson Foundation, UK, and graduated from the International Olympic Academy (IOA), affiliated to the University of Athens. In 1994, he was selected by the Ministry of Foreign Affairs in Japan to represent Sri Lanka at the South Asian Youth Exchange program. Only Sri Lankan media personality to be trained in the world-renowned IOA in Athena, Greece. Holds a diploma in sports leadership conducted by the International Olympic Committee (IOC).

He is a honorary member of the International Taekwon-Do Federation he has been Sri Lanka’s prolific Sports Editor / sports journalist for over three and a half decades and is also the IAAF athletic correspondent for Sri Lanka. He is the most experienced and widely travelled sports writer in Sri Lanka who has covered a record seven editions of the Olympic Games (1992, 2000, 2004, 2008, 2012, 2016 and 2020), eight IAAF World Athletic Championships (2001, 2003, 2005, 2007, 2009, 2011, 2013 and 2015) and six Asian Games (1994, 1998, 2002, 2006, 2010 and 2014).

Weerawansa has covered many milestone events in Sri Lanka sport, including Susanthika Jayasinghe winning the 2000 Sydney Olympic Games silver medal and 2007 World Championship bronze medal as well as Damayanthi Darsha and Sugath Tillakaratne winning gold medals for Sri Lanka (3) after 25 years at 1998 Bangkok Asian Games. He had also served as a radio and television commentator at several international events, including Olympic Games, Asian Games, South Asian Games and Test/ ODI international cricket matches and represented Sri Lanka at the Asian Sports Press Union Congress in Seoul in 1990 and 1992 and South Asian Sports Association in Dhaka, 1993 - was elected Chairman of its Cricket Commission.

International assignments as a media personality & Sports assignments
XXVth Olympic Games in Barcelona, 1992
XXV11 Olympic Games in Sydney, 2000
XXV111 Olympic Games in Athens, 2004
XX1X Olympic Games in Beijing, 2008
XXX Olympic Games in London, 2012
XXX1 Olympic Games in Rio de Janeiro, 2016
XXX11 Olympic Games in Tokyo, 2020
8th IAAF World Championships in Edmonton, 2001
9th IAAF World Championships in Paris-Saint Dennis, 2003
10th IAAF World Championships in Helsinki, 2005
11th IAAF World Championships in Osaka, 2007
12th IAAF World Championships in Berlin, 2009
13th IAAF World Championships in Daegu, 2011
14th IAAF World Championships in Moscow, 2013
15th IAAF World Championships in Beijing, 2015 
11th Asian Games in Hiroshima, 1994
12th Asian Games in Bangkok, 1998
13th Asian Games in Busan, 2002
14th Asian Games in Doha, 2006
15th Asian Games in Guangzhou, 2010
16th Asian Games in Incheon, 2014
Asian Athletic Championships in Manila, 1993
South Asian Games in Dhaka, 1993
Asian Athletic Grand Prix Manila, 2007

General assignments
Commonwealth Heads of Government Meeting (CHOGM) in Perth, 2011
President Mahinda Rajapaksa's state visit to Japan, 2007

References

External links
 LakeHouse - officials

Living people
Sinhalese people
Alumni of Royal College, Colombo
National and Kapodistrian University of Athens alumni
Sri Lankan journalists
1966 births